Little Glitches are a  folktronica collective from Sheffield, UK.  The group formed in 2004 after collaborating and writing together in previous bands. The founding members of the collective are Andrew Bolam (bass guitar), Gavin Harris (drums), Iain Stewart (acoustic guitars), and Sam Smith (Rhodes piano). All four members share vocal duties and they have been noted for their strong four part harmonies and song writing in numerous newspaper and magazine articles; such as Sandman magazine, Dazed & Confused magazine and the Sheffield Telegraph. Since 2010 the band has begun taking a more collective based approach to their music making, working independently and jointly with other local musicians. During 2012 several new demo tracks appeared on their website blog and there are rumours of new releases in 2013.

History

In 2004, the band released their first eponymously titled EP through small independent label Irrepressible Records, all entirely self written, recorded and produced. The CD release featured original cover art by Sam Wilson, who was to go on to provide pictures and designs for all their subsequent releases. The EP gained a warm review in Dazed & Confused magazine, in their Releases of the Month section.

In 2005, the band performed in a film by Newcastle-based artists Susie Green and Ilana Mitchell entitled The Set Up, which featured a number of North East bands, seven artists including Field Music, Futureheads, Les Cox Sportifs and Paul Smith.

On 4 September 2006, the band released their second cd ep, Sudden Moment of Clarity on the small independent record label Full on Calm Recordings. Again a self written and recorded effort, this time the band received some production help from Steve Fellows. The EP was released on CD and also as a digital download via AWAL and featured a re-recording of one track from the first EP, Secondhandmind.

On 15 January 2007, the Sudden Moment of Clarity EP was chosen by Steve Lamacq as the record of the week on his BBC 6 Music radio show.

In December 2008, the yet to be officially released song "Cold Day" was remixed by Winter North Atlantic.

A further remix of the title track was created by The Cutler (featuring Steve Cobby of Fila Brazillia and Porky of Pork Recordings) around the same time.

On 28 April 2009, the track "123" was featured as track of the day on the Q magazine website prior to the later release of the 123ep.

On 29 May 2009, The Sudden Moment of Clarity remix by Industrial-U-Knit was released on the Ninja Tune Solid Steel podcast, chosen by DK.

On 1 June 2009, the 123ep was released through Full on Calm Records as a CD and Digital Download via AWAL with the band continuing to record and produce everything themselves. The EP featured the original version of 'Cold Day' that had previously been remixed by Winter North Atlantic. The ep was played by BBC 6 Music DJs Lauren Laverne, Tom Robinson and Gary Crowley and BBC Radio 2 DJ Janice Long.

The title track 123 was remixed by Ross Godfrey of Morcheeba and subsequently new vocals were recorded by Nathalia Ivanovski with the band.

The release was also notable for the inclusion on the CD of films for two of the featured songs by artist friends of the band Matt Fleming of The Star and Shadow Cinema and Sam Wilson. The films were not included in the download release.

A limited tour was undertaken by the band to promote the release of the EP, including a show in London at the Notting Hill Arts Club, at the same time as the venue hosting an art exhibition by Sam Wilson. The exhibition included original paintings used for the cover of the 'Sudden Moment of Clarity' ep.

The band next gained another Single of the Week on 26 October 2009 on Sean Keaveny's BBC 6 Music breakfast show, preceding 9 November 2009 release of the band's fourth EP Early Morning Time. The CD EP was put out under the Full on Calm Records label and as a digital download via AWAL.

The release was again supported by a small tour.

On 1 March 2010, the band released a compilation CD Life's Little Glitches, featuring most of the tracks from the preceding four EPs, through 'The Killing Moon Presents' label and also as a digital download via AWAL. The release did not feature the secret track 'Little Tweet' from the Little Glitches EP, the version of 'Secondhandmind' from the Sudden Moment of Clarity ep, the Industrial U-Knit remix of 'Sudden Moment of Clarity' from the 123 ep and also did not include the two films present on the CD version of the 123ep. All other tracks were presented in chronological order.

On 21 June 2010, the band released their first full-length album of mostly new material, along with a scattering of lead tracks from the previous EPs, through The Killing Moon Presents label as a digital download only via AWAL. The album was entitled Garden Rooms in memory of one of the band's former rehearsal spaces in an old Sheffield workshop, one part of which was still inhabited by Stan Shaw, a Little Mester - the name given to local master craftsmen working in Sheffield Steel whom do piece work especially making cutlery.

Following another short tour in support of the release the band curated the Penelopes Stage on the Saturday at that year's Tramlines Festival, putting on a line-up including Neil McSweeney, Fallen Trees, Ray Heane with Bodhran player Ciaran Boyle, plus the band themselves.

Following that, the band retreated into the studio at the end of August 2010 and began to pro-actively collaborate with other local musicians and writers such as Lisa Palmer, who has previously worked with Animat, Laura Burn Acaster of Little Robots and The Shaking Whips, Bennett Holland who is currently (2011) also working with Toddla T, King King and Jube, Julie Clarkson, also of Jube, Kieron Wright The Shaking Whips and The Jesus Loves Heroin Band, Chuffy Stanley and many others. Since February 2011, the band have been posting monthly tracks on their blog showcasing the first fruits of these collaborations.

Released 10 June 2013, Little Glitches are featured vocalists on the album "Everything Touches Everything Else" by The Cutler (Steel Tiger Records, 2013).

Track listings

Little Glitches ep
2004 - Irrepressible Records

 Secondhandmind
 A Minor in Sheffield
 What You Don't Know
 Mistakes
 A Minor Reprise
 Little Tweet (secret track)

Sudden Moment of Clarity ep
04/09/2006 - Full on Calm Recordings/AWAL

 Sudden Moment of Clarity
 Secondhandmind
 Sweeping Away
 All This Time
 Are You Scared

123 ep
01/06/2009 - Full on Calm Recordings/AWAL

 123
 Cold Day
 Two Dead Men
 Trees Line Roads
 Sudden Moment of Clarity (Industrial-U-Knit remix)
 Sunshine On Rain
 123 - Animated film by Sam Wilson
 Stringly Glitch Technicolour (sunshine on rain) - Film by Matt Fleming

Early Morning Time ep
9 September 2009 - Full on Calm Recordings/AWAL

 Early Morning Time
 Full Load on Wool
 Here Comes the Weekend
 Happiness
 Here Comes The Weekend (reprise)

Life's Little Glitches
01/03/2010 - The Killing Moon Presents/AWAL

1. Secondhand Mind
2. A Minor in Sheffield
3. What You Don't Know
4. Mistakes
5. A Minor Reprise
6. Sudden Moment of Clarity
7. Sweeping Away
8. All This Time
9. Are You Scared
10. 123
11. Cold Day
12. Two Dead Men
13. Trees Line Roads
14. Sunshine On Rain
15. Early Morning Time
16. Full Load on Wool
17. Here Comes the Weekend
18. Happiness
19. Here Comes The Weekend (reprise)

Garden Rooms
21 June 2010 - The Killing Moon Presents

1. Which Way to a Better Life
2. Stumble
3. Down the Road
4. Birthday Oohs
5. Sudden Moment of Clarity
6. Wednesday Again
7. 123
8. Crystal Peaks
9. Come on Now
10. Dark Days
11. Puttin it Badly
12. What you Don't Know

External links 

 
 Little Glitches on Last fm
 Online review of 123ep
 Online live review
 Website for the set up film

English electronic music groups
English folk musical groups
Psychedelic folk groups
Musical groups from Sheffield
Musical groups established in 2004
Folktronica musicians